Crataegus pentagyna, also called small-flowered black hawthorn, is a species of hawthorn native to southeastern Europe. Two subspecies are recognized, C. p. subsp. pentagyna and C. p. subsp. pseudomelanocarpa. The fruit are usually black, but are sometimes a handsome purple.

See also 
 List of hawthorn species with black fruit

Images

References

pentagyna
Flora of Ukraine